Polypogon monspeliensis, commonly known as annual beard-grass or annual rabbitsfoot grass, is a species of grass. It is native to southern Europe, but it can be found today throughout the world as an introduced species and sometimes a noxious weed. It is an annual grass growing to heights between 5 centimeters and one meter. The soft, fluffy inflorescence is a dense, greenish, plumelike panicle, sometimes divided into lobes. The spikelets have long, thin, whitish awns, which give the inflorescence its texture.

References

External links
Grass Manual Treatment
Jepson Manual Treatment — invasive plant species
USDA Plants Profile — invasive plant species
Photo gallery

monspeliensis
Flora of Europe
Flora of Africa
Flora of temperate Asia
Flora of tropical Asia